Marek Indra (born April 11, 1989) is a Czech professional ice hockey right winger currently playing for HC Kobra Praha of the Czech 2. liga.

Indra previously played two games in the Czech Extraliga for BK Mladá Boleslav during the 2011–12 season. He also played in the Polska Hokej Liga for Naprzód Janów.

Before turning professional, Indra played in the Ontario Hockey League for the Sarnia Sting, who drafted him 41st overall in the 2007 CHL Import Draft.

References

External links

1989 births
Living people
Czech ice hockey right wingers
HC Dukla Jihlava players
LHK Jestřábi Prostějov players
Sportovní Klub Kadaň players
HC Kobra Praha players
Manchester Phoenix players
BK Mladá Boleslav players
Naprzód Janów players
Piráti Chomutov players
Sarnia Sting players
Ice hockey people from Prague
HC Thurgau players
Czech expatriate ice hockey players in Canada
Czech expatriate ice hockey players in Germany
Czech expatriate ice hockey players in Switzerland
Czech expatriate sportspeople in England
Czech expatriate sportspeople in Poland
Expatriate ice hockey players in Poland
Expatriate ice hockey players in England